Jennifer Rhodes (born Janice Wilson, August 17, 1947) is an American actress.

Life and career
The daughter of Bennie and Clara Wilson, she was born and grew up in Rosiclare, Illinois and became interested in theater while attending Southern Illinois University and moved to New York City soon after graduating. She studied acting and began getting cast for theatre roles. After marrying Jordan Rhodes, she eventually moved to Los Angeles where she stopped acting for a while because she felt, as a stage actress, she didn't know very much about acting for television or movie roles. She eventually auditioned successfully for commercials roles, later moving on to television and film.

Rhodes' first credited role was in the 1960s television series The High Chaparral as the character Tanea. In 1980, she played a press secretary on a made-for-TV movie about Jackie Kennedy. In 1988, she appeared in the New World Pictures film Heathers as Winona Ryder's mother. She appeared on the following select series: Fame, Matlock, Little House on the Prairie, L.A. Law, Quantum Leap, Knots Landing, Designing Women, Full House, Red Shoe Diaries, Party of Five, ER, Wings, Murphy Brown, 3rd Rock from the Sun, Family Matters, Friends, Popular, The Agency, and Boston Public. She also appeared on the Disney Channel's The Suite Life on Deck.

Rhodes may be best known as Penny "Grams" Halliwell on The WB series Charmed, where she starred as the ghost of the Charmed Ones's grandmother and the tough-as-nails matriarch of the Halliwell clan. Although not a regular she did appear frequently throughout all 8 seasons of the original series.

 Her first regular series role was in Nightingales as the character Effie Gardner.

Marriage
She married Jordan Rhodes and later moved to Los Angeles from New York City with him. The marriage ended in divorce. She never remarried and has no children.

Filmography

Film

 Stand Up and Be Counted (1972) - (uncredited)
 Big Rose: Double Trouble (1974, TV Movie)
 The Towering Inferno (1974) - Janet - Secretary (uncredited)
 The Death of Richie (1977, TV Movie) - Elaine
 Red Light in the White House (1977) - Carrie Russell
 Night Creature (1978) - Georgia
 Halloween (1978) - Psych Ward Nurse (uncredited)
 Sketches of a Strangler (1978) - Eileen
 Jacqueline Bouvier Kennedy (1981, TV Movie) - Press Secretary
 I'm Going to Be Famous (1983)
 Ghost Fever (1986) - Madame St. Esprit
 The Eleventh Commandment (1986)
 Body Count (1987, TV Movie)
 Slumber Party Massacre II (1987) - Mrs. Bates
 Heathers (1988) - Veronica's Mom
 Nightingales (1988, TV Series) - Effie Gardner
 Twenty Dollar Star (1990) - Renee
 Frame-Up II: The Cover-Up (1992) - Brook's Landlady
 Exiled in America (1992) - Sister Mary Catherine
 The Baby Doll Murders (1993) - Mrs. Landers
 There Was a Little Boy (1993, TV Movie) - Dr. Blum
 Doorways (1993, TV Movie) - Mother
 Night of the Demons 2 (1994) - Sister Gloria
 Killing Obsession (1994) - Ella
 Skeletons (1997, TV Movie) - Mrs. Gallway
 The Killers Within (1997) - Hanna
 Cold Case (1997, TV Movie) - Miranda Allison
 Chasing Tchaikovsky (2007) - Mrs. Winnington
 Let the Game Begin (2010) - Hope
 Class (2010, TV Movie) - Judge
 Dispatch (2011) - Mrs. Gordon
 The Lost Medallion: The Adventures of Billy Stone (2013) - Ms. Sally
 Lovesick (2013) - Mother

Television

References

External links

Living people
American film actresses
American television actresses
American stage actresses
Actresses from Illinois
People from Hardin County, Illinois
1947 births
21st-century American women